SFHAM (single fibre based heart activity model) is a physical model describing the electric activity of the left ventricle of the heart during its depolarisation. It facilitates a precise analysis of electric potentials of different parts of the ventricle.

Main principles of the model 

The SFHAM model is based on the following principles:
 Each part of the cardiac muscle (interventricular septum, anterior wall, inferior wall, lateral wall, posterior wall) is the source of independent instantaneous potential.
 Electric potential coming from a particular part of the myocardium is the result of variation in electric charge density including endocardium, M cells and epicardium.
 QRS unit is the result of  the sum of all instantaneous potentials generated during depolarization of particular parts of myocardium.
 The value of instantaneous potential depends on the quality and activity of particular parts of the ventricle walls.
 Time changes in the value of the potentials distribution occurring on the surface of the chest depend on physiological and pathological factors.
 Electrical activity of each part of the myocardium of a healthy individual forms a constant contribution expressed in percentage into the entire activity of the myocardium.

The model constitutes a theoretical basis for SATRO-ECG being a system to non-invasive diagnosing facilitating early detection ischemic changes in the heart.

References

Bibliography 
 Janicki JS, Leoński W,  Jagielski J. Partial potentials of selected cardiac muscle regions and heart activity model based on single fibres. Medical Engineering & Physics, 31 (2009) 1276-1282 
 Janicki JS, Leoński W, Jagielski J, Sobieszczańska M, Chąpiński M, Janicki Ł. Single Fibre Based Heart Activity Model (SFHAM) Based Qrs-Waves Synthesis. W: Sobieszczańska M, Jagielski J, Macfarlane PW, editors. Electrocardiology 2009. JAKS Publishing Company; 2010. p. 81-86,  
 Janicki JS, Leoński W, Jagielski J, Sobieszczańska M, Leońska JG. Implementation of SFHAM in Coronary Heart Disease Diagnosis. W: Sobieszczańska M, Jagielski J, Macfarlane PW, editors. Electrocardiology 2009. JAKS Publishing Company; 2010. p. 197-201,

External links
 SFHAM model and SATRO-ECG method web page  (english)
 Instytut Badań Fizykomedycznych The Institute for Physico-Medical Research web page (polish)

Cardiology